Darren John Sutherland (18 April 1982 – 14 September 2009) was an Irish professional boxer from Mulhuddart, Dublin. His amateur career was crowned by a 2008 Olympic bronze medal.

Early life
Sutherland was born in Dublin to Linda from Finglas and Anthony Sutherland from Saint Vincent in the West Indies.  The family lived in London until Darren was seven and then in Saint Vincent for four years, before returning to Dublin and latterly Navan, County Meath.

Amateur career
Sutherland represented the St Saviour's ABC in Dublin and won the Leinster senior title in 2005, 2006 and 2007. He faced Edward Healy in the 2006 and 2007 Final and Darren O'Neill in 2008 winning all three. Sutherland's international career featured a great rivalry with Britain's James DeGale, who later paid tribute to Sutherland upon winning his first professional world title in 2015.

2007 | EU Amateur Championships
At the 2007 EU Amateur Championships in Dublin, Sutherland won gold at middleweight. Results were:

 Mario Duro: Won - RSC (Round 3)
 Ivano Del Monte: Won - PTS (32:19)
 James DeGale: Won - PTS (23:19)

2008 | EU Amateur Championships
At the 2008 EU Amateur Championships in Cetniewo, Sutherland won gold at middleweight. Results were:

 Samy Anouche: Won - PTS (28:12)
 Stefan Härtel: Won - PTS (20:9)
 James DeGale: Won - PTS (22:16)

2008 | Olympic Games
At the 2008 Olympic Games in Beijing, Sutherland won bronze at middleweight. Results were:

First round bye: Advanced
 Nabil Kassel: Won - RSC (Round 4)
 Alfonso Blanco: Won - PTS (11-1)
 James DeGale: Lost - PTS (3-10)

Professional career
Following the exposure gained at the Olympics, Sutherland was offered a number of contracts as a professional boxer. In October 2008 he signed terms with London-based promoter Frank Maloney. On 18 December 2008, Sutherland made a winning start to his professional career with a first-round knockout of Georgi Iliev in Dublin. After the bout, Sutherland's promoter Frank Maloney said "I think we've found a real superstar here tonight and this is just the start of a long journey". His next fight, against Siarhei Navarka on 6 March at Robin Park Arena in Wigan, ended with Sutherland winning by a third round stoppage.

Sutherland won his third fight at the Fenton Manor Sports Complex in Stoke-on-Trent on 29 May against Vepkhia Tchilaia. Sutherland won his next fight against Gennadiy Rasalev in York Hall, London.

Professional boxing record

Death
On 14 September 2009, Sutherland was found dead with his wrists bound at his apartment in Bromley by his promoter, Frank Maloney.  It was alleged he died by hanging himself. He had depression. Olympic gold medalist, James DeGale commented on the death stating: "It is very, very sad news - I just can't believe it, It is a tragedy. First and foremost, my heart goes out to his family. I just could not believe it; my heart went to the floor when I heard. He was a big part of my Olympic medal journey and it is just terrible. I just do not know what to say except that he was a brilliant fighter, in fact an excellent fighter, and he was a gentleman outside the ring as well. He had an Olympic bronze medal and his whole life to look forward to. He had a great future, and my heart goes out to everyone who knew him."

His corpse was exhumed in September 2010 for a further private postmortem at the request of his family. An open verdict was delivered at the inquest in March 2012. Following Sutherland's death, James DeGale kept the initials 'DS' on his shorts in professional bouts. When he won the IBF super middleweight world title against Andre Dirrell in 2015, he spoke post-fight of his relationship with Sutherland and dedicated the victory to him. "It's for Darren Sutherland as well, of course. My late rival" he said. "When he took his life back in 2009 it was horrendous. From when he passed, I've always had 'DS' on my shorts. And this world title is for him as well. A great guy. A great fighter. Unbelievable fighter. We've had some great, great scraps. It's for him."

References

External links
 

1982 births
2009 suicides
Boxers at the 2008 Summer Olympics
Olympic boxers of Ireland
Olympic bronze medalists for Ireland
Olympic medalists in boxing
Medalists at the 2008 Summer Olympics
Irish male boxers
Middleweight boxers
Suicides by hanging in England
Sportspeople from Dublin (city)
People with mood disorders
Irish people of Saint Vincent and the Grenadines descent
Irish people of Afro-Caribbean descent